Gazza ( Ghazza) is a village in Sughd Region, northern Tajikistan. It is part of the jamoat Voru in the city of Panjakent.

References

Populated places in Sughd Region